Pongolania is a genus of South African araneomorph spiders in the family Phyxelididae, and was first described by C. E. Griswold in 1990.  it contains only two species, found only in South Africa: P. chrysionaria and P. pongola.

See also
 List of Phyxelididae species

References

Endemic fauna of South Africa
Araneomorphae genera
Phyxelididae
Spiders of South Africa